Sofiya Vasilyevna Kalistratova, also known as Sofia Kallistratova (Rylsk – 5 December 1989, Moscow) was a public defense lawyer in the Soviet Union. She defended various Soviet dissidents and from 1977 was a member of the Moscow Helsinki Group (MHG), distributing information about human rights violations in the Soviet Union.

Biography 
.

Born in the town of Rylsk, she graduated from the Moscow State University, specializing in the field of law. Unable to find a position in prosecutor's office, she began her activity as public defender at the Moscow College of Advocates (Московская Коллегия адвокатов). According to rumors, in the 1960s, the officer who was issuing her with a new passport, misspelled the last name "Kallistratova" as "Kalistratova".  Sofiya did not make a big deal out of it and signed the documents as Kalistratova ever since.

She joined the Moscow Helsinki Group as a legal consultant.  The KGB searched Kalistratova's apartment several times and confiscated typewriters and documents.  Some of Kalistratova's friends were arrested.  The activity of the Moscow Helsinki Group became nearly impossible when Yuri Andropov started his campaign of repression against dissidents. Supporters claim that all their work defending the human right to obtain, discuss, and distribute information was legal.

As many other human rights defenders, she was accused of Anti-Sovietism; the charges were later dropped. In 1987, she tried to initiate a campaign for amnesty for political prisoners.

During perestroika and glasnost, material regarding violations of the law between 1917 and 1985 were published in the mass media. The popular question of correspondents of newspapers was: "In your family, how have your views on the politics of the Soviet Union changed since Glasnost?", and the relatives of Kalistratova could answer: Our point of view did not change during this glasnost. That time, various literators used to say "We did not know" about the period 1917–1986, and, especially, about the Brezhnev stagnation (1966–1985). She usually replied: "You are lying. You do not look like an idiot. You DID know, but you were afraid to talk about it."

Yuly Kim dedicated her a song.

Death
Kalistratova died in 1989 and was interred in Vostryakovskoye Cemetery in Moscow. For her activism, she was awarded the medal of the Guild of Russian Advocates. In 2003, a book about her life was published.

Works

References

External links

New York Times article, 29 July 1985
Moscow Helsinki Group website (in Russian)
Софья Васильевна Каллистратова (in Russian)

1907 births
1989 deaths
People from Kursk Oblast
People from Rylsky Uyezd
Soviet dissidents
Soviet political activists
Soviet lawyers
Soviet women lawyers
Moscow Helsinki Group
Soviet human rights activists
Women human rights activists
Public defenders
Moscow State University alumni